Daniel Bellamy may refer to:

Daniel Bellamy, the elder (1687–?), English writer
Daniel Bellamy, the younger (c. 1715–1788), English writer and divine